Madison High School is a three-year public secondary school in Rexburg, Idaho, the county seat of Madison County. It is the only traditional high school in the Madison School District #321, which includes Rexburg and the majority of the county. The school colors are red, white, and gray, and the mascot is a bobcat.

Athletics
Madison competes in athletics in IHSAA Class 5A with the largest schools in the state. It is a member of the High Country Conference (5A) with Rigby, Thunder Ridge, and Highland of Pocatello.

With one of the smaller enrollments in 5A, Madison has moved up or down in classification several times over the decades. The Bobcats have won a number of state championships in both boys and girls sports.

The 2012 football team went undefeated (12–0) to win its seventh state football title, its first in Class 5A, defeating Coeur d'Alene High School 37–30 at Holt Arena in Pocatello, Idaho.

Rivals
Madison's traditional rival is Rigby, although Rigby has spent many years in a different conference than Madison. However, in 2016 Rigby joined Madison in the 5A conference. Another rival is the Highland Rams from Pocatello, Idaho.

State championships
Debate (2): 2014, 2015
Speech (2): 1990, 2018
INL Scholastic Team (Science Bowl) (1): 2011

Boys
 Football (7): 1980, 1982, 1983, 1984, 1994, 1995, 2012 
 Cross Country (1): 1983
 Basketball (8): 1930, 1954, 1981, 1997, 2001, 2002, 2007, 2011
 Track (1): 2004
 Golf (3): 1982, 1983, 2006

Girls
 Cross Country (1): 1990
 Volleyball (3): 1988, 1989, 1992, 2018
 Basketball (6): 1980, 1984, 1985, 1988, 1989, 1990
 Softball (1): 2004

Notable alumni
 Matt Lindstrom, professional baseball player in Major League Baseball 
 Clayton Mortensen, professional baseball player in Major League Baseball
James Clarke, businessman and philanthropist
 Chari Hawkins, American heptathlete

Reference List

External links
 

Public high schools in Idaho
Schools in Madison County, Idaho